Safar Barlik is a 1967 Lebanese musical and a war film directed by Henry Barakat. The film stars Fairuz, Nasri Shamseddine, Huda, Assi Rahbani, Berj Fazlian, Salah Tizani and Salwa Haddad. It was filmed in the northern village of Beit Chabab and Douma in Lebanon.

Plot
The film displays the struggles of a Lebanese village under the Seferberlik during World War I.

Cast
 Fairuz as Adla
 Nasri Shamseddine as Elmoukhtar
 Huda as Zoumorod
 Assi Rahbani as Abou Ahmed
 Berj Fazlian as Re'fat Bek
 Rafic Sabeii as Abou Darwish
 Salwa Haddad as Oum Youssef
 Joseph Nassif as Elhasoon
 Layla Karam as Zahia
 Salah Tizani as Fares
 Abdulallah Homsi as Asad
 Ahmed Khalifa as Haji Noula
 Ihssan Sadek as Abdo

Music
Notable songs from the film include: 
"Ya Tayr" (Oh Bird! يا طير)
"Allamouni Henni Allamouni" (they taught me your love علّموني هنّي علّموني)
"Ya Ahl El Dar" (Lords of the mansion يا أهل الدار)

References

External links
 

1967 films
Lebanese war drama films
1967 war films
Films set in 1914
Films directed by Henry Barakat